John of Castile, called the "el de Tarifa" (1262–25 June 1319) was an infante of Castile and León. He was engaged in a decades-long fight for control over the Lordship of Biscay with Diego López V de Haro, the uncle of his wife.

Biographical sketch 
He was born before 15 April 1262 in Seville, the son of Alfonso X, King of Castile and León and Queen Violant of Aragon. In 1296, during the minority of his nephew Ferdinand IV of Castile, John was declared King of León, Galicia and Seville, although in 1300 he reconciled with Ferdinand IV and entered his service. In 1312, after the death of Ferdinand IV, he was appointed guardian of his son Alfonso XI, whom he served alongside Queen María de Molina and Infante Peter of Castile, Lord of Cameros.

He was the Lord of Valencia de Campos and Biscay, by his marriage to María Díaz de Haro, and was also Lord of Baena, Luque, Zuheros, Lozoya, Villalón, Oropesa, Santiago de la Puebla, Melgar de Arriba, Paredes de Nava, Medina de Río Seco and Castronuño, and he served as alférez (armour-bearer) of the King and mayordomo mayor (high steward) of the King. He was also Adelantado of Andalusia. He died in 1319 at Pinos Puente, in the battle of Sierra Elvira, also known as the disaster of Vega de Granada.

Marriages and issue 
On 17 February 1281, he married Margaret, who died in 1286, daughter of William VII, Marquess of Montferrat and Elizabeth of Gloucester, with whom he had:
 Alfonso of Valencia de Campos, married as his first wife, Teresa, daughter of Juan Núñez I de Lara and in 1314, married Juana Fernández de Castro, daughter of Fernando Rodríguez de Castro and granddaughter of King Sancho IV of Castile.

One year after the death of his first wife and before 11 May 1287 he married María Díaz de Haro with whom he had three children:
 Juan de Castilla y Haro, known as Juan el Tuerto (the one-eyed).
 Lope Díaz de Haro died after 1295 in his youth.
 María Díaz de Haro

Ancestry 

|-

|-

|-

|-

|-

|-

|-

|-

Notes

References

Bibliography

External links 
   Ficha genealógica del infante Juan de Castilla, hijo de Alfonso X el Sabio
 

1262 births
1319 deaths
Castilian infantes
Castilian House of Burgundy
Lords of Spain
Regents of Castile
Sons of kings